Ville Kolppanen (born September 5, 1992) is a Finnish professional ice hockey goaltender who is currently playing with Rungsted Seier Capital in the Metal Ligaen.

Playing career
Kolppanen played youth hockey with Tappara before moving to Ilves, and making the Junior A level before moving to North America for one major junior season in appearing with the Lethbridge Hurricanes of the Western Hockey League (WHL) in the 2009–10 season.

Undrafted, Kolppanen returned to Finland with Ilves, making his professional debut in the SM-liiga during the 2010–11 season.

After playing three years in Russia with HC Neftekhimik Nizhnekamsk of the Kontinental Hockey League (KHL), Kolppanen moved to Sweden in agreeing to a contract with Rögle BK of the SHL prior to the 2017–18 season on July 6, 2017.

References

External links

1992 births
Finnish ice hockey goaltenders
Ilves players
Living people
Lethbridge Hurricanes players
HC Neftekhimik Nizhnekamsk players
Rögle BK players
Södertälje SK players
Sportspeople from Vaasa